This is the list of current members of the Provincial Assembly of Khyber Pakhtunkhwa elected following the 2018 provincial election.

After the merger of FATA into Khyber Pakhtunkhwa, the number of members of the Assembly rose from 124 to 145, adding 16 general seats, 4 reserved seats for women and 1 reserved seat for non-Muslims. Elections on the 16 general seats were held on 20 July 2019.

The 11th Provincial Assembly was dissolved on 18 January 2023.

Members

References

2018 Pakistani general election
Lists of current office-holders in Pakistan
Khyber Pakhtunkhwa MPAs 2018–2023